Wrestling at the 2019 African Games was held from 28 to 30 August 2019 in El Jadida, Morocco.

Participating nations

Medal table

Medal summary

Men's freestyle

Men's Greco-Roman

Women's freestyle 

Egyptian Hala Ahmed, who competed in the 50 kg event, was convicted of doping. Her bronze medal went to Ibtissem Doudou.

References

External links 
 Results
 Results book

2019 African Games
African Games
2019 African Games
2019